This is a list of cricketers who have played in the Indian Premier League. The first tournament was organised in the year 2008, and a new one takes place every following year.

The list of players

The list contains the team each player represented in each tournament from 2008. An 'X' indicates that the player did not take part that year.

List of players who made their cricket debut in the IPL

See also
 List of Indian Premier League records and statistics

References

External links

 

Indian Premier League lists